Kalyani Government Engineering College (KGEC), Kalyani, West Bengal, India offers undergraduate (B.Tech.) and postgraduate (M.Tech., M.C.A.) engineering degree courses affiliated to the Maulana Abul Kalam Azad University of Technology(MAKAUT), West Bengal previously known as West Bengal University of Technology (WBUT).

Campus

Kalyani Government Engineering College is an engineering college in West Bengal, India. The college was established in 1995 by the Government of West Bengal. The college is located within the University of Kalyani Campus, Kalyani Township, District Nadia, West Bengal. Kalyani is 53 km. from the Sealdah Railway station (Eastern Railways) of Kolkata and is also connected through Kalyani Expressway. The nearest railway station to the college is Kalyani Ghoshpara railway station is about 2 km. away from the venue.

Academics

Affiliation and accreditations 
 All India Council for Technical Education [AICTE]
 University Grants Commission (India) [UGC], Government of India
 Ministry of Human Resource Department, Government of India
 Ministry of Higher Education Dept., Govt. of West Bengal

Academic programmes

Undergraduate courses offered: 
 B.Tech in Electrical Engineering
 B.Tech in Mechanical Engineering
 B.Tech in Electronics and Communication Engineering
 B.Tech in Computer Science and Engineering
 B.Tech in Information Technology

Postgraduate courses offered: 
 M.C.A. - Master of Computer Applications
 M.Tech in Production Engineering (Manufacturing Engineering)
 M.Tech in Computer Science and Engineering
 M.Tech in Electronics & Communication Engineering
 M.Tech in Information Technology
 M.Tech in Electrical Engineering

Admission procedure 
The undergraduate students (B.Tech.) of this college are admitted through the West Bengal Joint Entrance Examination (WBJEE)which is very competitive in nature. B.Tech. courses have a provision of 20% lateral entry at the second-year level from WB Joint Entrance Examination for Lateral Entry (JELET). Also there are additional 5% seats that are allocated for Tuition Fee Waiver Scheme of Govt. of West Bengal.

Similarly, the M.C.A. students are being admitted through the WB MCA Joint Entrance Examination (JECA).

The institute takes admission to M Tech courses by GATE examination and PGET exam conducted by WBUT.

The institute being a government one, has no management quota private admission facility for any of its courses.

Publications
The college also publishes an annual research journal, named, Reason - A Technical Journal, since 1999. In 2011, International Standard Serial Number (ISSN 2277-1654) was allotted to this journal.

Rankings
The college is regulated, operated and administered by the Government of West Bengal.
 KGEC is ranked no. 69 in all India rankings of Top 100 Engineering Colleges of India in 2012. As per the survey conducted by The Telegraph it is ranked 4th best engineering institute in West Bengal which admits through WBJEE.

Student life

Student accommodation(hostels)

For Boys : 
 Raja Rammohan Roy Hall (New Hall)
 Vidyasagar Chhatrabas (VC)
 Acharya Prafulla Chandra Roy Hall (APC)
 Type IV Boys Hostel (M.Tech)
 Rishi Bankim Chandra Hall (RBC)

For Girls : 
 Pritilata Chhatrinivas (PC)

Acharya Prafulla Chandra Roy Hall is reserved for first-year students. All the hostels except VC are located inside the college campus. There is accommodation for the MCA students, in Vidyasagar Chhatrabas (VC).
There are a total of 13 clubs in the college.

See also
List of institutions of higher education in West Bengal
Education in India
Education in West Bengal

References

External links 

 
University Grants Commission
National Assessment and Accreditation Council

Colleges affiliated to West Bengal University of Technology
Engineering colleges in West Bengal
Universities and colleges in Nadia district
Kalyani, West Bengal
1995 establishments in West Bengal
Educational institutions established in 1995